New River was a ward in the London Borough of Hackney and forms part of the Hackney North and Stoke Newington constituency. Consisting of an area of Stamford Hill the ward also incorporated the large council estate of Woodberry Down. The ward takes its name from the New River, built to supply London with drinking water in the early 17th century.

The ward returned three councillors to the Borough Council, with elections every four years. At the previous election on 6 May 2010 Maureen Middleton (Conservative Party); and Labour Party candidates Michael Jones and Sean Mulready were returned. Turnout was 56%; with 3,956 votes cast.

In 2011 New River ward had a total population of 12,551. This compared with the average ward population within the borough of 12,962.

References

Wards of the London Borough of Hackney
2014 disestablishments in England
1965 establishments in England